HMS Dwarf was a Decoy-class cutter launched in 1810. She participated in the capture of a French privateer and in operations in the Gironde. After the end of the Napoleonic Wars she captured some smuggling vessels. She was wrecked in March 1824.

Wartime service
Lieutenant Samuel Gordon commissioned Dwarf in March 1810 for the Downs.

On 5 September Dwarf recaptured Jusle.

On 2 March 1811, the master of the ship Mercury wrote a letter to the newspaper The Pilot that on 28 February his ship had fought off three French privateers near Dungeness. The fire from Mercury had wounded the sergeant of marines on Phipps. The only shots the naval vessels had fired were two musket shots to get Mercury to stop, and the only reason that the naval vessels had not fired their guns was because of the chance that Mercury was a British ship. Bell admonished all merchant captains to be a little more circumspect in the future.

On 22 August 1811 Dwarf recaptured New Galen.
     
When news of the outbreak of the War of 1812 reached Britain, the Royal Navy seized all American vessels then in British ports. Dwarf was among the Royal Navy vessels then lying at Spithead or Portsmouth and so entitled to share in the grant for the American ships Belleville, Janus, Aeos, Ganges and Leonidas seized there on 31 July 1812.

When the lugger tried to cross Bermudas bow, Bermuda fired several broadsides. Eventually the privateer struck to the boats of Dwarf and Pioneer after having suffered three men killed and 16 wounded, most severely. She was Bon Génie, of Boulogne. She was armed with 16 guns, but only four were mounted. She also had a crew of 60 men.

On 4 November 1813 Dwarf captured the merchantman Charlotte and her cargo.

On 30 March 1814 Dwarf was in the British squadron that entered the Gironde. She later shared in the prize and head money for the squadron's activities on 2 and 6 April.

In January 1819 the London Gazette reported that Parliament had voted a grant to all those who had served under the command of Admiral Viscount Keith in 1812, between 1812 and 1814, and in the Gironde. Dwarf was listed among the vessels that had served under Keith in 1813 and 1814. She had also served under Kieth in the Gironde.

Post-war service
On 27 October 1816 Dwarf captured the smuggling vessel Venus. On 24 December Dwarf captured the smuggling vessel To Brothers.

On 26 March 1817 and 2 and 4 April seized a total of 3120 gallons of spirits.

Between October 1818 and January 1819 Dwarf was at Plymouth undergoing repairs and fitting. In November 1818 Lieutenant Nicholas Chapman recommissioned Dwarf. Lieutenant George Read replaced Chapman in command of Dwarf in November 1821.

In January 1823 Lieutenant Nicholas Gould took command of Dwarf.

Fate
On 3 March 1824 Dwarf, Lieutenant Nicholas Gould, was in Kingstown Harbour, Dublin and secured to a mooring buoy. The weather looked threatening so Gould ordered precautions be taken. The gale built to the point that the cables to her anchors and the buoy parted. The wind drove her towards the shore until she collided with the Eastern Pier. The waves threw Dwarf repeatedly against the pier, battering her until she foundered. A marine died when he fell between Dwarf and the pier.

Notes

Citations

References
 
 
 

1810 ships
Cutters of the Royal Navy
Maritime incidents in March 1824